Xerochlamys is a genus of trees and shrubs in the family Sarcolaenaceae. The species are all endemic to Madagascar.

Species
Eight species are recognised:
 Xerochlamys bojeriana  
 Xerochlamys coriacea  
 Xerochlamys diospyroidea  
 Xerochlamys elliptica  
 Xerochlamys itremoensis  
 Xerochlamys tampoketsensis  
 Xerochlamys undulata  
 Xerochlamys villosa

References

 
Malvales genera
Taxa named by John Gilbert Baker